Ballinamere GAA is a Gaelic Athletic Association club located in Ballykimurray, Tullamore, County Offaly, Ireland.

Honours
 Leinster Junior Club Hurling Championship (1): 2013
 Offaly Intermediate Hurling Championship (3) 1945, 1953, 2013
 Offaly Junior A Hurling Championship (5) 1944, 1950, 1959, 1980, 2010 
 Offaly Junior Football Championship (2) 1983, 1998

References

External links
 Ballinamere GAA Club

Gaelic games clubs in County Offaly
Hurling clubs in County Offaly
Gaelic football clubs in County Offaly